Jón Axel Guðmundsson (born 27 October 1996) is an Icelandic professional basketball player for Victoria Libertas Pesaro of the Italian Lega Basket Serie A (LBA). He played college basketball for the Davidson Wildcats. He won two national championships with Grindavík in 2012 and 2013 and the Icelandic Basketball Cup in 2014.

Playing career

Grindavík
After coming up through the junior ranks of Grindavík, Jón Axel played his first senior match with the club in 2011. He won the Icelandic championship with the club in 2012 and 2013 and the Icelandic Basketball Cup in 2014.

Church Farm
Jón Axel started the 2014–2015 season with Church Farm School, averaging a team best 21 points per game before the christmas break. In January 2015, he decided to leave the school and return to Grindavík.

Return to Grindavík
In 12 regular-season games with Grindavík during the 2014–2015 season, Jón Axel averaged 15.6 points and 6.4 assists per game. He had a rough first-round series against eventual champions KR, going scoreless in game two and averaging only 6.7 points in the three-game sweep.

During the 2015-2016 season, Jón Axel continued his improvement, averaging a career high 16.8 points and 8.0 rebounds, along with 5.2 assists per game. He scored a career high 35 points against Keflavík on 8 February 2016. In the playoffs, Grindavík faced KR again in the first round. Jón Axel posted a triple double in the first game, with 10 points, 12 rebounds and 10 assist but despite his performance, KR won 85-67. KR blew out Grindavík in the next two games and completed another three game sweep for the second year in a row. For the series, Jón Axel averaged 8.3 points, 8.3 rebounds and 5.7 assists.

College
Jón Axel joined Davidson College in 2016. On 26 December 2016, he was named the Atlantic 10 Conference Rookie of the Week.  On 23 November 2017, he was named the Atlantic 10 Conference Player of the Week.

On 11 March 2018, Jón Axel won the Atlantic 10 Conference championship with Davidson and helped the team advance to the 2018 NCAA Division I men's basketball tournament. He averaged 13.2 points, 6.0 rebounds, and 5.1 assists per game as a sophomore.

Coming into his junior season. Jón Axel was named to the Preseason Third Team All-Atlantic 10. On 17 November 2018, Jón Axel scored 33 points in Davidson's 57–53 victory over Wichita State in the opening round of the Charleston Classic. On 26 January 2019, Jón Axel scored 27 points, including two free throws with 5 seconds left, in Davidson's 54–53 victory against Saint Louis. On 22 February 2019, he posted a triple-double, 20 points, 10 rebounds and 10 assists, in a 75–66 victory over Rhode Island. It was the first triple-double for a Davidson player since John Falconi had 17 points, 12 rebounds and 11 assists in 1973. On 25 February he was named the Atlantic 10 Player of the Week after averaging 23.0 points, 9.0 rebounds and 7.5 assists during the week of 18–24 February.

On 12 March 2019, Jón Axel was named the Atlantic 10 Player of the Year as well as being selected to the First-team All-Atlantic 10 after averaging 17.2 points, 7.3 rebounds and 4.7 assists per game for the season.

In April 2019, Jón Axel declared for the 2019 NBA draft. In May 2019, he had workouts with the Sacramento Kings and the Utah Jazz. On 27 May, he announced that he would withdraw from the draft and return to Davidson for the 2019–20 season.

In December 2019, Jón Axel was named to the U.S. Basketball Writers Association watch list for the Oscar Robertson Trophy.

In 2020 he became the first Division I men's player since 1993 to hit career marks of 1,500 points, 700 rebounds, 500 assists, 200 made 3-pointers and 150 steals. At the close of the regular season, he was named to the Third Team All-Atlantic 10.

With the 2019–20 season having been his final season of college eligibility, Jón Axel was automatically eligible for the 2020 NBA draft.

Skyliners Frankfurt
On 15 July 2020, he signed with the Fraport Skyliners of the Basketball Bundesliga (BBL). For the season, he averaged 12.3 points, 3.1 rebounds and 3.7 assists per game. In July 2021, it was announced that he would play for the Phoenix Suns in the 2021 NBA Summer League.

Fortitudo Bologna
On 18 August 2021, he signed with Fortitudo Bologna of the Lega Basket Serie A (LBA).

Crailsheim Merlins
On January 18, 2022, he has signed with Crailsheim Merlins of Germany's Basketball Bundesliga.

Return to Grindavík
In September 2022, he worked out for the Golden State Warriors along with several other veteran players. After contemplating offers from teams in Europe and the G-League, Jón Axel joined Grindavík in October 2022.

Victoria Libertas Pesaro
On November 1, 2022, he signed with Victoria Libertas Pesaro of the Italian Lega Basket Serie A (LBA).

National team career
In 2014, Jón Axel was named tournament MVP of U-18 Nordic Championship after averaging 29.3 points per game for the Icelandic U-18 team. He helped Iceland's U20 team finish second in the 2016 FIBA Europe Under-20 Championship Division B. For his effort he was named to the All-Tournament team.

Jón Axel played five games for the Icelandic men's national basketball team during the 2017 Games of the Small States of Europe. He did not fight for a spot on Iceland's EuroBasket 2017 team due to injuries.

Career statistics

College

|-
| style="text-align:left;"| 2016–17
| style="text-align:left;"| Davidson
| 31 || 29 || 31.8 || .411 || .327 || .733 || 4.0 || 3.5 || 1.1 || .1 || 8.2
|-
| style="text-align:left;"| 2017–18
| style="text-align:left;"| Davidson
| 33 || 33 || 35.8 || .460 || .406 || .796 || 6.0 || 5.1 || 1.3 || .0 || 13.2
|-
| style="text-align:left;"| 2018–19
| style="text-align:left;"| Davidson
| 34 || 34 || 36.8 || .460 || .353 || .826 || 7.3 || 4.8 || 1.3 || .1 || 16.9
|-
| style="text-align:left;"| 2019–20
| style="text-align:left;"| Davidson
| 30 || 30 || 35.5 || .420 || .339 || .769 || 7.1 || 4.3 || 1.2 || .1 || 14.5
|- class="sortbottom"
| style="text-align:center;" colspan="2"| Career
| 128 || 126 || 35.0 || .441 || .358 || .791 || 6.1 || 4.4 || 1.3 || .1 || 13.3

Personal life
Jón Axel is the son of Stefanía S. Jónsdóttir, a former member of the Icelandic women's national basketball team, and Guðmundur Bragason, a former professional basketball player and the highest capped player in the Icelandic men's national basketball team history. His younger brother is basketball player Ingvi Þór Guðmundsson.

Awards, titles and accomplishments

Individual awards

College
Atlantic 10 Player of the Year :2019
First-team All-Atlantic 10: 2019

National teams
U-18 Nordic Championship MVP: 2014
FIBA Europe U-20 Championship Division B All-Tournament Team: 2016

Titles

Iceland
Icelandic league champion (2): 2012, 2013
Icelandic Supercup (2): 2012, 2013
Icelandic Basketball Cup: 2014
Icelandic Company Cup: 2011

College
Atlantic 10 Conference champion: 2018

References

External links
Icelandic statistics
Davidson Wildcats bio
RealGM profile

1996 births
Living people
Crailsheim Merlins players
Davidson Wildcats men's basketball players
Fortitudo Pallacanestro Bologna players
Jon Axel Gudmundsson
Jon Axel Gudmundsson
Jon Axel Gudmundsson
Jon Axel Gudmundsson
Lega Basket Serie A players
People from Grindavík
Point guards
Skyliners Frankfurt players
Jon Axel Gudmundsson